Jerseyville is a farming/bedroom community in the rural western area of the former town of Ancaster. The community was initially called Jersey Settlement by the United Empire Loyalist settlers from New Jersey who settled the area in the late 1790s, but was changed to its present name in 1852 when a post office was opened.  It supports United Church, Baptist Church and formerly an elementary school, general store and a motorcycle dealership. Jerseyville's former elementary school is currently (2017) home to Circus Orange, and the general store is home to Black & Smith Country General.

The Brantford to Hamilton rail trail passes through Jerseyville in place of the old train tracks. The original Jerseyville train station building can be found at Westfield Heritage Village in Rockton, Ontario.

See also
Places named after the Channel Islands

References

http://ancasterhistory.ca/wp-content/uploads/2016/02/The-Roadside-History-of-Old-Ancaster-Township.pdf

Neighbourhoods in Hamilton, Ontario